Chicago, Milwaukee and St. Paul Depot may refer to:

Chicago, Milwaukee and St. Paul Depot (Montevideo, Minnesota), listed on the National Register of Historic Places in Chippewa County, Minnesota
Chicago, Milwaukee and St. Paul Depot (Yankton, South Dakota), listed on the National Register of Historic Places in Yankton County, South Dakota
Chicago, Milwaukee and St. Paul Railway Company Passenger Depot, listed on the National Register of Historic Places in Dodge County, Wisconsin

de:Chicago, Milwaukee and St. Paul Depot